The Bangkok Cobras are a professional basketball team from Thailand, Southeast Asia that play in the Asean Basketball League.

Roster

References

External links 
 Bangkok Cobras Official Site
 Cobras Webblog, same as official site 
  Bangkok Cobras on Facebook
  Bangkok Cobras on Twitter
 

ASEAN Basketball League teams
Basketball teams established in 2011
2011 establishments in Thailand
Basketball teams in Bangkok
Basketball teams in Thailand
Sport in Bangkok